Rudolf Heinrich Zirkwitz (1857 – 1926) was a Baltic German architect working in present-day Latvia.

Rudolf Heinrich Zirkwitz studied at the Riga Polytechnic Institute (today Riga Technical University) and graduated in 1882. Apart from his work as an architect, he was also an assessor in a number of insurance companies and worked as a building inspector at the Riga City Construction Board and taught drawing at the City Gymnasium. As an architect, he designed around 25 multi-storey apartment buildings in Riga and also supplied the plans for Igate Manor and plans for the rebuilding of Bīriņi Palace. The buildings he designed were Eclectic, with occasional influences from Art Nouveau. Many of the buildings designed by Zirkwitz in Riga were built during the heyday of Art Nouveau architecture in the city.

References

Architects from Riga
Art Nouveau architects
Baltic-German people
1857 births
1926 deaths
Riga Technical University alumni